Tryptophanyl-tRNA synthetase, cytoplasmic is an aminoacyl-tRNA synthetase enzyme that attaches the amino acid tryptophan to its cognate tRNA. In humans, it is encoded by the WARS gene.

Two forms of tryptophanyl-tRNA synthetase exist, a cytoplasmic form, named WARS, and a mitochondrial form, named WARS2. Tryptophanyl-tRNA synthetase (WARS) catalyzes the aminoacylation of tRNA(trp) with tryptophan and is induced by interferon. Tryptophanyl-tRNA synthetase belongs to the class I tRNA synthetase family. Four transcript variants encoding two different isoforms have been found for this gene.

Phenylalanine Incorporation 
Although WARS1 classically aminoacylates tryptophan, during states tryptophan depeletion, this enzyme has been observed to activate both tryptophan and phenylalanine.

References

Further reading